The 6th (Manawatu) Mounted Rifles was formed on March 17, 1911. They were mobilised during World War I as a squadron of the Wellington Mounted Rifles Regiment. They served in the Middle Eastern theatre of World War I and first saw action during the Battle of Gallipoli.
As a part of the larger New Zealand Mounted Rifles Brigade (of the ANZAC Mounted Division), they went on to serve in the Sinai and Palestine Campaign.

Great War battles
 Battle of Gallipoli
 Battle of Romani
 Battle of Magdhaba
 Battle of Rafa.
 First Battle of Gaza
 Second Battle of Gaza
 Third Battle of Gaza
 Battle of Beersheba
 Battle of Megiddo (1918)

Between the wars
Admiral of the Fleet John Jellicoe was appointed honorary colonel of the Regiment in 1923. The regiment was renamed the 6th New Zealand Mounted Rifles (Manawatu) in 1921 and later to the simple Manawatu Rifles, which was absorbed into 2nd Armoured Regiment on 29 March 1944.

Notable unit members
 Major Norman Frederick Hastings, DSO, mid, Légion d'honneur, Officer Commanding the 6th (Manawatu) Squadron, Wellington Mounted Rifles Regiment who died of wounds after the attack on Chunuk Bair, Gallipoli in August 1915.

Alliances
 – 5th Royal Inniskilling Dragoon Guards

References

New Zealand in World War I
Cavalry regiments of New Zealand
Military units and formations established in 1911
Military units and formations disestablished in 1921
Military units and formations of New Zealand in World War I
History of Manawatū-Whanganui
1911 establishments in New Zealand